Tung Ying-chieh (Pinyin: Dǒng Yīngjié) (1897 - 1961) was a leading master of t'ai chi ch'uan, and a top disciple of Yang Ch'eng-fu. Born in Ren County, Hebei, China, his given name was Wen-k'e (Pinyin: Wénkē). Famous in his time for defeating a foreign boxer in a public challenge match, he dedicated his life to the martial arts, training intensively in multiple styles, serving as chief assistant instructor for Yang Ch'eng-fu, and going on to found his own thriving t'ai chi legacy.

Early life

He was born to a prosperous farming family, and as a child was very studious but frail. Avidly interested in martial arts even then, at age 12 he convinced his grandfather to send him away to learn from security professional and martial arts master Liu Ying-chou (Pinyin: Liú Yíngzhōu), also known as Liu Lao-ying (Pinyin: Liú Lǎoyíng). There he trained in San Huang P'ao Ch'ui and other Shaolin styles. Liu also taught him some t'ai chi ch'uan.

After five years he returned home to marry and join the family business, but soon sought out Liu Lao-ying again to resume training. Liu recommended deeper study of t'ai chi ch'uan, and through Liu's relationship with Yang Chao-lin (Pinyin: Yáng Zhàolín, 1884-1922), the eldest grandson of Yang Lu-ch'an, Tung studied Yang-style t'ai chi ch'uan under Li Tseng-kwei (Pinyin: Lǐ Zēngkuí). Tung was impressed with Li's pushing hands skills, but at that time Tung's expertise in external martial arts — on which he relied in those years to deal with bandits and other conflicts — remained better than his understanding of t'ai chi ch'uan.

Tung achieved a high level of skill in t'ai chi ch'uan after Liu introduced him to Li Bao-yü (Pinyin: Lǐ Bǎoyù, 1889-1961), who was known by the courtesy name Li Hsiang-yüan (Pinyin: Lǐ Xiāngyuǎn). Li had mastered Wu (Hao)-style t'ai chi ch'uan under Hao Wei-chen, and was famous for defeating all challengers in and out of the ring, including some local gangsters. For three years Tung lived with Li, worked for him in his business, and trained intensively in Wu (Hao) style and Li's advanced techniques. From that time on Li became a lifelong coach, mentor, and friend.

Career

Mastery

In 1926, Tung moved to Beijing seeking instruction from Grandmaster Yang Ch'eng-fu in Yang-style t'ai-chi ch'uan. He quickly mastered Yang Ch'eng-fu's "large frame" techniques, and served as chief assistant instructor for much of the last 10 years of Yang's life.

While in Beijing he also trained under Yang's older brother Yang Shao-hou in "small frame" Yang t'ai chi, and practiced push hands with Chen style master Ch'en Fa-k'e. Also training with Yang Shao-hou were Tung's future lifelong colleagues, the Wu-style masters Wu Kung-i and Wu Kung-tsao.

A few years later he resumed training with Li Bao-yü to master the Wu (Hao) style as well, and so the Tung family trace their t'ai chi ch'uan lineage through both Yang and Wu (Hao).

Jianghu journeys

In 1928 Tung moved south with a group led by Yang Ch'eng-fu to establish t'ai chi ch'uan schools in other cities. Later that year he established his prowess and the reputations of his teachers by defeating nine push hands challengers at the Hangzhou National Martial Arts Arena Competition (Pinyin: Hángzhōu Guóshù Lèitáisài).

He was the principal contributor to Yang's 1931 book Methods of Applying Taiji Boxing,  and helped establish Yang t'ai chi schools and classes in Hangzhou, Nanjing, and other cities, including Suzhou where he led classes by himself, Shanghai, and Guangzhou where he assisted and then took over when Yang returned to Shanghai in 1935.

Ying-chieh

He earned the name Ying-chieh, which can be translated as "heroic figure", in his early thirties by defeating a British strongman in a brutal public boxing match in Nanjing. Tung defended the honor of t'ai chi ch'uan and Chinese martial arts, and bolstered Chinese national pride after the foreigner had issued insulting racial taunts and had already defeated several other Chinese martial artists.

Li Bao-yü coached Tung for that competition, after planning to take the challenger on himself but then dropping out because, as the story goes, a local gangster hired by the British deputy consul threw lime powder in Li's eyes which temporarily blinded him. After the fight, Tung threw his winner's jackpot of silver coins into the crowd, asking the audience to cover transportation home for other Chinese martial artists who had competed.

Nationalism had been stoked on both sides in no small part because his opponent was sponsored by the British deputy consul. As word of Tung's win and generosity spread across the country, he was hailed as a hero of the Chinese people. And so from that time on, Tung Wen-k'e was known only as Tung Ying-chieh.

Ying-kit

In 1936 after Yang Ch'eng-fu passed away, Tung Ying-chieh was invited to teach in Hong Kong, where he founded the Tung Ying Kit Tai Chi Chuan Gymnasium — "Kit" (Jyutping: git6) is the Cantonese pronunciation of chieh (Pinyin: jié) — and became the first to teach Yang-style t'ai chi ch'uan in the colony. In 1939 he was also invited to teach in Macau, where he established another successful school. From 1941 to 1945 during the Japanese occupation of Hong Kong, he relocated to Macau which as a Portuguese colony was neutral territory.

He then returned to Hong Kong, enlisting his children in growing both t'ai chi schools, and in 1948 with the help of eldest son Tung Hu Ling (Pinyin: Dǒng Hǔlǐng) he published  (The Meaning and Significance of T'ai Chi Ch'uan Practice) which illustrated and explained the Yang-style curriculum and introduced his Ying Chieh Fast Form (Pinyin: Yīngjié Kuàiquán — see the section on the Tung family forms below). Also known as the "Red Book" due to the cover of the Hong Kong edition, it has been reprinted many times.

In the 1950s his network of schools and students expanded to Thailand, Singapore, and Malaysia under the management of Tung Hu Ling, their success in Southeast Asia ensured after a few Muay Thai boxers famously challenged and failed to defeat their t'ai chi. Tung Ying-chieh also led efforts to coordinate with leading Yang and Wu (Pinyin: Wú) stylists for the promotion of t'ai chi, organizing a large gathering of practitioners in Hong Kong, and serving as a judge for a wildly popular public match in Macau between his longtime colleague, Wu-style t'ai chi master Wu Kung-i, and a master of Tibetan White Crane. At that 1954 fight, Tung was filmed demonstrating techniques with an Eagle Claw master, and performing his Ying Chieh Fast Form.

Final years

In his final years Tung Ying-chieh lost weight and strength, but it is clear in films of him performing t'ai chi that he retained his balance, grace, and martial skills longer than most. He continued his teaching and practice as long as he was able, as well as the calligraphy and painting he had mastered in Macau during World War II, and in his last days took the time to tell stories of his past to his family, especially his youngest child Jasmine, who was then 21. One night in 1961, in Hong Kong, he died peacefully in his sleep at home.

Legacy

Tung family

After Tung Ying-chieh's death in 1961, his daughter and youngest child Jasmine Mood-lay Tung (Pinyin: Dǒng Mòlì, Jyutping: dung2 mut6 lei6, 1940-2009) continued teaching at the Tung Ying Kit Tai Chi Chuan Gymnasium in Hong Kong, taking over as head of the school in 1966. She also taught in the UK, founded a school in Australia, and served as instructor and advisor to the Taiji Society of the Chinese University of Hong Kong. She was the first Hong Kong martial artist to become an International Wu Shu Federation referee, serving as referee and referee director for events in Hong Kong, mainland China, and Japan, including the 11th Asian Games in Beijing. She also served as president of the Hong Kong Wushu Federation and the Hong Kong Jingwu Athletic Association, and played a prominent role in promoting t'ai chi in Hong Kong and abroad.

Tung Ying-chieh's son Dong Junling (Pinyin: Dǒng Jùnlǐng, born , Pinyin: Dǒng Jùnbiāo, 1923-1983) worked closely with the family in Hong Kong for several years, where among other things he posed with his brother Tung Hu Ling for photographs of t'ai chi applications to be used in Tung Hu Ling's book,  (Methods of Applying Taiji Boxing). But in the early 1950s he returned home to Ren County in Hebei for good, where he continued to teach t'ai chi to a select group of students for many years, including his nephew, Tung Hu Ling's son Dong Zeng Chen.

Tung Ying-chieh's eldest son Tung Hu Ling (Pinyin: Dǒng Hǔlǐng, Jyutping: dung2 fu2 ling1, 1917-1992), who had played a prominent role in opening and growing Tung family schools in Hong Kong, Macau, and Southeast Asia, continued to lead classes there for about five years after his father's death. But in 1966 he was invited to promote t'ai chi on a tour of North America which he completed in 1967, after which he moved to Honolulu, Hawaii to establish a new school and home base in the USA.

Tung Hu Ling's son Tung Kai Ying (Jyutping: dung2 gai3 ying1; Pinyin: Dǒng Jìyīng, 1941-) also led classes at the Southeast Asia locations, taking over in 1962 before joining him in Hawaii in 1969, and then founding a Los Angeles school in 1971. Tung Hu Ling's other son Dong Zeng Chen (Pinyin: Dǒng Zēngchén, 1947-) taught in mainland China for many years before moving from Hebei to take over the Hawaii school after Tung Hu Ling's retirement in 1983, accompanied by his son Da De "Alex" Dong.

In 2003 Alex Dong (Pinyin: Dǒng Dàdé, 1971-), Dong Zeng Chen's son and great grandson of Tung Ying-chieh, established a school in New York City, while Tung Kai Ying's son Tung Chen-Wei David ( Pinyin, Dǒng Zhènwēi, 1977-) — another great grandson of Tung Ying-chieh — is also a master instructor, based at the Los Angeles school. All regularly travel to teach classes and workshops as well, resulting in many additional schools and practice groups around the world. Dong Zeng Chen retired in 2021.

Tung Ying-chieh's granddaughter-in-law Cheng Hsiao-fen (Jyutping: zeng6 siu2 fan1; Pinyin: Zhèng Xiǎofēn, 1955-) in Hong Kong and a long list of disciples worldwide also continue the Tung family t'ai chi tradition.

Tung family t'ai chi

Tung family t'ai chi training offers a strong foundation in Yang-style t'ai chi ch'uan, and advanced training in Wu (Hao) and Tung styles. This Yang style is the classic traditional Yang Ch'eng-fu form as he taught it in the latter half of his career, and as Yang Ch'eng-fu, Tung Ying-chieh, and T'ien Chao-lin (Pinyin: Tián Zhàolín; 1891-1960) demonstrated in photos for the 1931 and 1934 books published under Yang's name, with small refinements by subsequent Tung family generations.

Each posture is taught with great attention to detail, and with an explanation of potential applications. Many students remain focused on the Yang slow form along with related drills, and some schools also teach shortened variations of that form to make practice convenient. But intermediate and advanced students may progress to the classic Yang-style straight sword (Pinyin: jiàn) and saber (Pinyin: dāo, also translated as "falchion" or "broadsword"), and Yang-style push hands (stationary, stepping, and four corners). When sufficient training space is available, advanced students may also learn the Yang-style spear ( Pinyin: qiāng, or often simply , gǎn, "pole", because the Yang "spear" is actually a very long sturdy pole with one tapered end but no spear point; based on the shape Tung Kai Ying calls it a "lance").

Advanced students may also learn two Tung-style fast forms, a Wu (Hao)-style form, advanced saber and double saber forms, and stick forms. 

Tung Ying-chieh collaborated with Yang Ch'eng-fu on development of what is now called the Tung-style Fa Jin Fast Form (Pinyin: Fājìn Kuàiquán), completing it after Yang passed away. The majority of this form is similar to the Yang Chengfu form as it was performed in the early twentieth century, before most t'ai chi forms were slowed and smoothed out to make them more accessible to the general public, in a swift-slow tempo and optionally with fa jin and the double jump kick from the old version of the form. It also includes some postures Tung developed from his training with Wu (Hao)-style master Li Bao-yü.

Tung then developed his Ying Chieh Fast Form (Pinyin: Yīngjié Kuàiquán), and introduced it to the world in his 1948 book. It is based on advanced Yang small frame and Wu (Hao) middle frame techniques that Tung developed from his training with Yang Shao-hou and Li Bao-yü. Like the other "fast form" this is performed in the old slow-swift tempo, and both may also be considered "application frame" (用架, Pinyin: yòngjià) forms.

The Wu (Hao) form is the K'ai-Ho (Pinyin: kāihé) Old Form of Hao Weizhen as taught by Tung Ying-chieh's teacher Li Bao-yü. It is most visibly distinct from other Wu (Hao) forms in its many slightly forward-inclined postures and in the internal strength projected through the hands, and it has been refined in small but significant ways by the Tung family. Because of this form's emphasis on "nei jin" — internal strength and structure — the Tung family also call it the "Hard Form" to contrast it with the Yang Cheng-fu "soft" form. It is generally performed more slowly than in most purely Wu (Hao) lineages, so that advanced students can focus on the unique Wu (Hao)-style internal training it contains, because this is the Dong family's only Wu (Hao) form. In other Wu (Hao) lineages this is an advanced fast (slow-swift tempo) form, but in Dong family schools that next step is offered through the Dong family fast forms described above.

Tung Hu-ling contributed all the saber and stick forms in the curriculum, including the standard Yang-style saber form and also advanced saber forms he created based on the teachings of Yang Ch'eng-fu's older brother, Yang Shao-hou, one for single saber and one for double sabers, vigorous routines that include long leaps, jump kicks, reverse spins, and challenging circles. Tung Hu-ling for a time taught those forms using sticks rather than swords, as sticks were easier to carry and practice with under the laws of British Hong Kong. He and his family further developed the stick forms into separate routines after moving abroad. He also created unique two-person push hands sets in Thailand, because many students there have a very martial orientation.

Tung Ying-chieh taught that there are in fact not three separate large, medium, and small "frames" of Yang style, that mastery of one will allow a student to understand the others and move freely between them, that all t'ai chi lineages including Wu (Hao) have a deep relationship, and that the Yang Ch'eng-fu "large frame" is simply the best place for beginners to start. And so Tung Ying-chieh and Tung Hu Ling were modest about their contributions to the art, and were never known to criticize other styles or masters.

Tung family legacy

The Tung family now has t'ai chi ch'uan students in over 20 countries and territories around the world, while maintaining warm connections to China including their ancestral home Renxian. Although Tung Ying-chieh is perhaps not as well-known in the West as some other masters, many seeking to learn t'ai chi for health or martial arts training have long found their way to him and his successors. For he was a champion, he was a master of multiple styles with his own unique synthesis, and he established a lasting legacy that has continued to thrive, with many affiliated schools in North America, Europe, and Asia.

Notes

References

Bibliography

 Hong Kong editions published by C & C Joint Printing Co., (H.K.) Ltd., no ISBN, distributed worldwide by Alex Dong Tai Chi in Traditional Chinese and partial English translation editions; Taiwan edition published by Dah Jaan Publishing in Traditional Chinese, ; mainland edition published by Beijing Science and Technology Publishing Co. Ltd. in Simplified Chinese (董英杰太极拳释义), .

 (Includes documentary on DVD, in Mandarin and some Cantonese, with no Chinese or foreign subtitles.)

External links

Dong Family: 
Los Angeles/USA (Tung Kai Ying)
New York/USA/International (Alex Dong)
Hong Kong Dong Yingjie Taijiquan Association (Dong Zheng Xiaofen)

Dong Disciples:
Affiliated schools, Alex Dong
Affiliated schools, Tung Kai Ying
Affiliated schools, Dong Zeng Chen
Chip Ellis (Dong T'ai Chi resource website)
Taijiquan Tutelage of Palo Alto (Tung Huling, Wu Ta-yeh lineage)
Grace Chui Tai Chi Club, Quebec (Tung Ying-chieh, Chui Lap Kan lineage)

YouTube Channels:
Alex Dong
Alex Dong Tai Chi
Tung Kai Ying (search)
Tai Chip (Chip Ellis, Hawaii)
Dong Tai Chi Hawaii (Janet Jin)
Dong Tai Chi (Dong Zeng Chen)
ShanShui Tai Chi Chuan, France
Tai Chi Chuan Toum Assn, France
Tai Chi Chuan ry, Helsinki, Finland
Nea Smyrni Tai Chi Chuan Assn, Greece
Dong Style Taijiquan  (Dong Bai Yan)
Grace Chui Tai Chi Club (in French and English languages)
Athens Tai Chi Chuan Assn,Greece/ Yiannis Zoumproulis

Other Videos:
Dong Tai Chi Online
Li Bao-yü disciple Ou-Yang Fang performing the Hao Weizhen Old Form in 1977

Facebook:
Group: Dong Style Tai Chi
Page: Dong Ying Jie Tai Chi Legacy
Page: Hong Kong Dong Yingjie Taijiquan Association
Page: Tung Tai Chi Chuan Arezzo (Italy)
Page: Tung Tai Chi Chuan Firenze (Italy)
Page Tai Chi Chuan Sweden
Page: Tai Chi Chuan Nea Smyrni (Greece)
Page: Knud Erik Andersens Tai Chi Chuan Institut (Denmark)
Page: Athens Tai Chi Chuan Assn (Greece) Yiannis Zoumproulis

Wikipedia (Chinese):
董氏快拳 (Dong Family Fast Form)

Baidu Baike (Chinese):
(The Wikipedia community has deprecated Baidu Baike as a generally unreliable source as of August 2020. Most links to Baidu are now removed. Nevertheless it is important to note that searches there on the following topics may be useful starting points for additional research.)
 (Dong Wenke, a.k.a. Dong Yingjie)
 (Liu Yingzhou, a.k.a. Liu Laoying)
 (Yang Zhaolin, a.k.a. Yang Laozhen)
 (Li Baoyu, a.k.a. Li Xiangyuan )
 (Dong Style Taijiquan)

1897 births
1961 deaths
Chinese tai chi practitioners
Sportspeople from Hebei